Bahramabad Rural District is in the Central District of Eslamshahr County, Tehran province, Iran. At the most recent National Census of 2016, the population of the rural district was 9,597 in 2,996 households. The largest of its 4 villages was Shatareh, with 7,150 people. The rural district also contains the villages of Bahramabad, Malekabad, and Mehranabad. The rural district was established on 16 April 2012.

References 

Eslamshahr County

Rural Districts of Tehran Province

Populated places in Tehran Province

Populated places in Eslamshahr County